Borja González Tejeda (born 17 November 1995) is a Spanish footballer who plays as a right back for Burgos CF.

Club career
Born in Pinto, Madrid, González was a Rayo Vallecano youth graduate. On 27 July 2014, he joined CA Pinto, club he already represented as a youth.

González made his senior debut on 7 September 2014, starting in a 0–1 Tercera División away loss against AD Alcorcón B. The following January, after being a regular starter, he moved to Atlético Madrid and was assigned to the C-team also in the fourth division.

González was promoted to the reserves following their relegation from Segunda División B, but was sparingly used. On 12 June 2017, he moved abroad for the first time in his career, joining Ascenso MX side Atlético San Luis.

González made his professional debut on 22 July 2017, starting in a 1–2 away loss against Alebrijes de Oaxaca. He scored his first goal six days later, netting the opener in a 2–0 home win against FC Juárez.

González returned to his home country on 30 January 2019, after agreeing to a six-month loan deal with UD San Sebastián de los Reyes. He subsequently represented neighbouring Las Rozas CF and CF Rayo Majadahonda, both in the third tier.

On 23 June 2022, González signed a two-year contract with Segunda División side Burgos CF.

References

External links
 
  
 
 
 
 

1995 births
Living people
Spanish footballers
Footballers from the Community of Madrid
Association football defenders
Primera Federación players
Segunda División B players
Tercera División players
Atlético Madrid C players
Atlético Madrid B players
UD San Sebastián de los Reyes players
Las Rozas CF players
CF Rayo Majadahonda players
Burgos CF footballers
Ascenso MX players
Atlético San Luis footballers
Spanish expatriate footballers
Spanish expatriate sportspeople in Mexico
Expatriate footballers in Mexico